Hagerstown Premium Outlets, is an open-air outlet mall located along Interstate 70,  east of the highway's junction with Interstate 81, in Hagerstown, Maryland, United States. It is one of two major shopping malls in Washington County (the other being the indoor Valley Mall).

Built by Baltimore-based Prime Retail and was formerly named Prime Outlets-Hagerstown, the outlet center opened in 1998 with approximately 55 stores. The center was designed with a village-style layout and walking lanes throughout.

Hagerstown Premium Outlets is chiefly anchored by Wolf Furniture & Outlet. Smaller anchor stores exist such as Adidas, Calvin Klein, Coach, Polo Ralph Lauren, and The Children's Place. The center also contains a food court with Auntie Anne's and Dairy Queen.

The outlet mall caters not only to residents in Hagerstown, surrounding Washington County, and neighboring counties in Maryland, West Virginia, Pennsylvania, and Virginia, but also to shoppers from the Washington, D.C. and Baltimore areas, especially on weekends and holidays.

In late August 2010, the center was acquired by Simon Property Group's Premium Outlet sector along with the majority of the Prime Outlet centers and was renamed Hagerstown Premium Outlets in September 2010.

Footnotes

External links
Hagerstown Premium Outlets

Outlet malls in the United States
Shopping malls in Maryland
Shopping malls established in 1998
Buildings and structures in Hagerstown, Maryland
Hagerstown metropolitan area
Tourist attractions in Hagerstown, Maryland
1998 establishments in Maryland
Premium Outlets